Peter Rohde (born 10 January 1965) is a Danish freestyle and medley swimmer. He competed at the 1984 Summer Olympics and the 1988 Summer Olympics.

References

External links
 

1965 births
Living people
Danish male freestyle swimmers
Danish male medley swimmers
Olympic swimmers of Denmark
Swimmers at the 1984 Summer Olympics
Swimmers at the 1988 Summer Olympics
Swimmers from Copenhagen